Caloptilia dogmatica is a moth of the family Gracillariidae. It is known from Sri Lanka and Thailand.

References

dogmatica
Moths of Asia
Moths described in 1908